The Charles I. Kidd House, located at 304 W. Howell St. in Hartwell, Georgia, was built in 1896.  It was listed on the National Register of Historic Places in 1986.

It is a two-story frame structure with Queen Anne architectural influences.  Also known as the Bailey Residence, the listing includes three contributing buildings and a contributing structure:  the property includes a historic brick
greenhouse, a historic frame garage, and a historic frame chicken house.

Charles I. Kidd was owner and manager of a livery business in downtown Hartwell.

References

Houses on the National Register of Historic Places in Georgia (U.S. state)
Queen Anne architecture in Georgia (U.S. state)
Houses completed in 1896
Houses in Hart County, Georgia
National Register of Historic Places in Hart County, Georgia
Hartwell, Georgia
1896 establishments in Georgia (U.S. state)